"The Gypsies" is a narrative poem in 569 lines by Alexander Pushkin, originally written in Russian in 1824 and first published in 1827. The last of Pushkin's four 'Southern Poems' written during his exile in the south of the Russian Empire, The Gypsies is also considered to be the most mature of these Southern poems, and has been praised for originality and its engagement with psychological and moral issues. The poem has inspired at least eighteen operas and several ballets.

Outline
The poem opens with an establishment of the setting in Bessarabia and a colorful, lively description of the activities of a gypsy camp there:

The poem is written almost exclusively in iambic tetrameter, and this regular metre is established from the outset:

 × /  × /     ×  /    × /
Горит огонь; семья  кругом
Gorít ogón'; sem'yá krugóm
 × / ×  / ×       /  ×   / ×
Готовит ужин  в  чистом поле (ll.9–10)
Gotóvit úzhin v chístom póle
(Burns a flame, and the family around it / Cook their supper; in the fresh field.)

Once the scene is set, the characters are introduced: an old man is waiting for his daughter Zemfira to return home while his dinner grows cold. When she arrives, she announces that she has brought home with her a man, Aleko, who has fled the city because the law is pursuing him.

At this point the narrative style changes: the omniscient narrator steps aside and the majority of the rest of the poem takes the form of a dialogue, following the tradition of closet drama. The Old Man and Zemfira welcome Aleko, but he retains lingering doubts about the possibility of happiness at the Gypsy camp:

Aleko is established as a Romantic hero: the narrator describes him as a tormented victim of passion and sounds an ominous note that his passions will return.

Zemfira asks Aleko if he misses the splendor of his homeland, but he responds that his only desire is to spend his life with her in voluntary exile. (ll.174–176). The Old Man warns that although Aleko loves the Gypsy life, this feeling may not last forever, and tells a story of a man that he knew who spent his entire life with the Gypsies but who eventually pined for his homeland and asked to be buried there. (ll.181–216). This is thought to be a reference to the Roman poet Ovid, who was banished to Tomis in 8 AD.

Two years pass (l.225) and Aleko remains with Zemfira in the Gypsy camp. However, Zemfira begins to sing a love song about an adulterous affair which shocks and scares Aleko (ll.259–266). At this point the poem switches from iambic tetrameter and is less consistent with fewer feet.

The Old Man warns Aleko that he has heard this song before from his wife Mariula who later left him. Aleko is upset by the song and falls asleep, and Zemfira is angry when she hears him pronounce another woman's name in his sleep (l.327). The Old Man warns Aleko not to expect Zemfira to be faithful (ll.287–299), and tells him in detail about how Mariula left him after only a year (ll.370–409). Aleko, however, insists on his "rights" (l.419), or at least the possibility of getting the pleasure of revenge (l.420).

Zemfira meets her lover at night and, just as they are parting, Aleko catches them together. In a scene of extremely fast-moving dialogue, he kills them both. The Old Man tells him to leave the Gypsies because his understanding of law, freedom and order is different from his (ll.510–520):

The poem closes with an epilogue narrated in the first person, who warns that the gypsy encampments offer no freedom from the "fateful passions" and problems of life.

Analysis
The poem addresses and interrogates the concept of the noble savage, an idea which had gained popular currency in the Romantic Age which held that those people who live further from "civilization" live "in harmony with nature and a more simple, childlike and blessed life" than the alienated and unhappy people in European cities. Antony Wood suggests that The Gypsies is a parody of both Rousseau's Noble Savage idea and Byron's verse tales, pointing out that "Aleko, pursuing the ideal of the Noble Savage, himself comes to present the spectacle of an noble citizen." John Bayley argues that The Gypsies "shows the problem of a poet as naturally classical as Pushkin in an epoch fashionably and self-consciously romantic."

Adaptations
Boris Gasparov estimates that The Gypsies has inspired some eighteen operas and half a dozen ballets, including Sergei Rachmaninoff's Aleko (1893), Ruggero Leoncavallo's Zingari (1912), and Vasily Kalafati's Gypsies [Tsygany] (1941).

It is speculated that The Gypsies was the inspiration for Prosper Mérimée's novella Carmen written in 1845, on which Georges Bizet's opera Carmen was based in 1875. Mérimée had read the poem in Russian by 1840 and translated it into French in 1852.

Sources
 Briggs, A.D.P. (1982) Alexander Pushkin: A Critical Study Duckworth: London. 
 Briggs, A.D.P. (2004) "Did Carmen come from Russia?" in English National Opera Programme.
 Gasparov, Boris. (2006)  "Pushkin in music" in The Cambridge Companion to Pushkin, ed. Andrew Kahn.  Cambridge: CUP 
 Hammond A. "Music Note" in programme for Carmen. Royal Opera House Covent Garden, 1984
 Pushkin, A.S. and Bondi S.M. (ed.) (1960) ЦЫГАНЫ in Собрание сочинений в десяти томах Moscow.
 Pushkin, Aleksandr, Antony Wood and Simon Brett. (2006)  The Gypsies & Other Narrative Poems.  Boston, MA: David R. Godine.

References

External links
Partially complete English translation of "The Gypsies"
 The text of Цыганы at Russian Wikisource

1827 poems
Fictional representations of Romani people
Poetry by Aleksandr Pushkin